Italy competed at the 1955 Mediterranean Games in Barcelona, Spain.

Medals

Athletics

Men

References

External links
Mediterranean Games Athletic results at Gbrathletics.com

Nations at the 1955 Mediterranean Games
1955
Mediterranean Games